Chris Davidson may refer to:

 Chris Davidson (athlete) (born 1975), English long jumper
 Chris Davidson (rower) (born 1971), Canadian Olympic rower
 Chris Davidson (surfer) (1978–2022), Australian surfer